The Podgorica Marathon is an annual road running event in Montenegro, which features a full-length (42.195 km) marathon, half marathon as well as a 5 km fun run race.

History 

A group of enthusiasts came up with a plan to organise a marathon in Podgorica and the first edition took place on 8 October 1994.

The 2011 edition of the race featured more than 3000 runners from 33 countries. Slađana Perunović set a women's Montenegrin record in the marathon at the event, finishing second in a time of 2:41:02 hours.

Course 

The 2014 course for the full-length marathon led from central Podgorica to the southern suburb of Golubovci, then east through the Zeta Plain, to the town of Tuzi, before returning to the center of the city.

The half marathon race course started in Danilovgrad, finishing at the center of Podgorica. The 5 km fun run course circles the urban center of Podgorica.

All the courses finish at the same spot, Independence Square.

Winners 

Key: Course record (in bold)

Notes

References

List of winners
Gasparovic, Juraj (2011-10-31). Podgorica Marathon. Association of Road Racing Statisticians. Retrieved on 2011-11-01.

External links
 Official website

Marathons in Europe
Marathon
Athletics in Montenegro
Recurring sporting events established in 1994
1994 establishments in Yugoslavia
Autumn events in Montenegro